The First 228 Peace Memorial Monument is a monument in East District, Chiayi City, Taiwan. It was built in 1989, which is the earliest 228 Peace Memorial Monument built in the island. It is the only 228 Peace Memorial Monument to have been built before the 1990s. It was built as a memorial of the February 28 Incident of 1947, in which more than 10,000 Taiwan residents were killed during an uprising against the government. The monument is one of the landmarks of Chiayi City.

Memorial Building 
There are more than ten memorial buildings commemorating the February 28 Incident in Taiwan. The most famous one is located at 228 Peace Memorial Park in Taipei. However, the First 228 Peace Memorial Monument is the most valuable, the first to be built and the only built in the 1980s. The monument was completed on August 19, 1989 under the leadership of then Chiayi City Mayor, Chang Po-ya.

Location 
This monument was established at MiTuo Road (彌陀路) in Chiayi City, which close to the boundary between Chiayi City and Zhongpu Township, Chiayi County originally. In 2017, in order to the Widening Project of MiTuo Road, the Memorial Monument move to Chiayi City 228 Memorial Park, which located at the intersection of MiTuo Road, QiMing Road (啟明路) and GongYi Road (公義路) .

Inscriptions 
There are 3 inscriptions engraved on the surface of the 228 Peace Memorial Monument:

"The Bible" Micah IV: 3-4 & Matthew Book V: 9

References 

1989 establishments in Taiwan
1989 sculptures
Buildings and structures in Chiayi
February 28 incident
East District, Chiayi
Peace monuments and memorials
Monuments and memorials in Taiwan